The Mixed team aerials competition at the FIS Freestyle Ski and Snowboarding World Championships 2021 was held on 11 March 2021.

Results
The final was started at 15:00.

References

Mixed team aerials